Psi Andromedae (ψ And, ψ Andromedae) is the Bayer designation for a triple star system in the northern constellation of Andromeda. The combined apparent visual magnitude of this system is 4.95.

The primary component has a stellar classification of G5 Ib, which matches the spectrum of an evolved supergiant star. It forms a pair with a star of type B9 with an unknown luminosity class separated by 0.28 arcseconds. A third component has a separation of 0.14 arcseconds. Details of the orbital arrangement remain uncertain.

Naming

References

Andromeda (constellation)
Spectroscopic binaries
G-type supergiants
Andromedae, Psi
Andromedae, 20
117221
9003
223047
Durchmusterung objects